Maconellicoccus is a genus of true bugs belonging to the family Pseudococcidae.

The species of this genus are found in tropical regions and Australia.

Species
Species:

Maconellicoccus australiensis 
Maconellicoccus hirstutus
Maconellicoccus hirsutus 
Maconellicoccus lanigerus 
Maconellicoccus leptospermi 
Maconellicoccus multipori 
Maconellicoccus ramchensis 
Maconellicoccus tasmaniae 
Maconellicoccus ugandae

References

Pseudococcidae